U.S. Route 72 (US 72) is an east–west United States highway that travels for  from southwestern Tennessee, throughout North Mississippi, North Alabama, and southeastern Tennessee. The highway's western terminus is in Memphis, Tennessee and its eastern terminus is in Chattanooga. It is the only U.S. Highway to begin and end in the same state, yet pass through other states in between. Prior to the U.S. Highway system signage being posted in 1926, the entire route was part of the Lee Highway.

Route description
The highway passes through Tennessee, Alabama, and Mississippi. Most of the original eastern and western portions of the route through roughly follows the path of the Memphis and Charleston Railroad, a railroad that predated the American Civil War and now operated by Norfolk Southern Railway as their Memphis-Chattanooga, Tennessee mainline. US 72 Alt. follows the Memphis and Charleston route through North Alabama.

West Tennessee
US 72 begins at Bellevue Boulevard (US 51) in Memphis. From Memphis, the route follows Union Avenue and Poplar Avenue into Collierville. Just south of Collierville, US 72 junctions State Route 385 (the Bill Morris Parkway), a freeway which links Collierville with I-240. This segment of the highway is concurrently designated State Route 86 (SR 86) south of its concurrency with SR 57 between Union Avenue in Memphis and Collierville.

Mississippi
US 72 enters Mississippi in western Marshall County. The route follows rolling hills across the extreme northern part of the state, passing through Walnut and Corinth as it heads east. Near Burnsville, US 72 crosses the Divide Cut of the Tennessee–Tombigbee Waterway. Farther east, the route enters the Tennessee Valley and heads through Iuka before crossing into Alabama.

All of US 72 in Mississippi has been upgraded to four-lane highway, with the last section between MS 302 and the Tennessee state line being completed in 2019. Legally, the Mississippi section of US 72 is defined in the Mississippi Code §65-3-3.

Alabama

US 72 enters Alabama just west of Cherokee. The route parallels the Tennessee River east to Muscle Shoals, where US 72 Alternate splits from US 72. The mainline turns north, passing through Muscle Shoals and crossing the Tennessee River, entering Florence on the opposite bank. From Florence to Huntsville, the route heads through areas dominated by farmland. Between the two locales, however, US 72 enters Athens.

After passing through Athens and an overpass with Interstate 65 (I-65), US 72 approaches Huntsville from the west.  Part of this section has the local name University Drive. At an interchange with Memorial Parkway, the route turns northward briefly, joining the routes of US 231 and US 431, until it breaks off from the Parkway and heads eastward again.  (This part is known to locals as "72 East" because it is east of the Parkway; it has no other name.)  Northeast of downtown Huntsville, US 72 interchanges with I-565. I-565/US 72 Alt., part of Corridor V of the Appalachian Development Highway System, terminates at the interchange while US 72 takes over the freeway alignment, joining Corridor V.

I-565 is mentioned as the eastbound route and SR 20 is mentioned as the westbound route. Signs for I-565 east at this interchange recently were changed to remove any mention of SR 20 east. Most of the US 72 portion of Corridor V is a four-lane divided expressway with at-grade intersections. Past Huntsville, US 72 follows several mountain valleys to Scottsboro. From Scottsboro, the route follows a northeasterly routing similar to that of the Tennessee River as it enters Tennessee for the second time.

All of US 72 within Alabama is four lanes in width. Additionally, much of US 72 has been upgraded through northeast Alabama, with interchanges at the major state highways. Just west of Moores Mill Road in Huntsville, US 72 becomes limited access over Chapman Mountain.  Throughout Alabama, US 72 is paired with unsigned State Route 2 (SR 2).

The stretch of US 72 paralleling I-59 to the far northeast in between Scottsboro and South Pittsburg contains multiple freeway-style Interchanges.

East Tennessee
US 72 enters Tennessee for the second time just south of South Pittsburg. At South Pittsburg, Corridor V ends at an interchange with Interstate 24. US 64, concurrent with I-24 west of the exit, departs the expressway and forms an overlap with US 72 through Kimball to Jasper, where US 41 joins the concurrency. Just east of Jasper, the highways cross the Tennessee River on Nickajack Lake. The route then follows a cut in the Cumberland Plateau made by the Tennessee River to the western outskirts of Chattanooga, where it interchanges with I-24 once more. Just east of the interchange, US 11 joins the overlap.

Together, US 11, US 41, US 64, and US 72 follow the bluffs on Lookout Mountain above the Tennessee River to Chattanooga, where the routes follow Broad Street north into downtown. At the corner of Main Street and Broad Street, US 72 comes to an end; US 76 begins at the intersection, making one highway in essence a continuation of the other.

History

West Tennessee

Originally, US 72 followed US 45 to Selmer and followed a route west to Memphis. In 1931, US 64 replaced US 72 between Memphis and Selmer. In 1935, US 72 was routed to Memphis through Mississippi from Corinth removing the extension on US 45 to Selmer.

As late as the early 1970s, US 72 followed State Route 57 (Poplar Avenue) from Collierville to its western terminus at East Parkway N. (which carried US 64, US 70, and US 79, as well as State Route 1). During the mid-1980s until the early 2000s, U.S. 72's westbound route in midtown Memphis was changed to switch from Poplar Avenue to a westbound off-ramp connection with Union Avenue (just as its name changed from Walnut Grove Road), instead of following Poplar west to East Parkway North. (In the same trend, eastbound US 72 ignored East Parkway South and continued eastward on Union—joining SR 57—until an exit ramp deposited the two highways onto eastbound Poplar.) Some signs still remain from this route change.

Mississippi

In Tishomingo County, US 72 originally followed the current Road 172 / Quitman Street through Iuka before being bypassed in the mid-1980s. Also, An Old US 72 exists south of US 72 between Burnsville and Glen. US 72 also followed Alcorn County Road 218 and entered Corinth on Proper Street. Until 1935, US 72 followed US 45, now Polk Street / Mississippi Highway 145 north into Tennessee. Also, included in the original 1935 routing west of Corinth followed Mississippi State Route 2 / Kossuth Road to Kossuth before turning west. Continuing westward, yet another segment of Old US 72 exists south of US 72 in Benton County from just west of the Tippah County line to just east of the Wolf River near Canaan. The bridge across the Wolf River collapsed due to flooding and is now closed; much of this segment is now on private property and little evidence of pavement remains due to washout and ecological succession. The continuation of this segment west of Wolf River to Mississippi Highway 5 is signed Wyatt Road. Finally, there is one more route that may have been a former US 72 road alignment. Boswell Road begins as a curve off of US 72 between Slayden and Mount Pleasant as a gravel road, and heads generally parallel to US 72 as a gravel road, before stopping in Mount Pleasant at Mississippi Highway 311. The possible former alignment then continues from the staggered junction heading west as a partially paved road.

Alabama

Most of the original US 72 route in Alabama paralleled the Memphis and Charleston Railroad, a critical route for the South during the American Civil War. Some sections of the original road were named the Memphis Pike reflecting the idea of connecting Chattanooga to Memphis, Tennessee. The original route also belonged to the original route of the Lee Highway. Both of these designations can be found in western Colbert County where sections of the original highway, including parts of Colbert County Route 20 still bear those names.

The original route once passed through Tuscumbia on what is named today the Old Lee Highway and Main Street. This route was bypassed in the 1960s.

In Florence US 72 originally followed Huntsville Road to Royal Avenue, then north to Tennessee Street, and finally west to Court Street. Its route was later moved two blocks south through downtown Florence, from Tennessee Street to Dr. Hicks Boulevard.

East of Florence the original route is now County Highway 66 through downtown Rogersville and Killen.

Athens' Clinton and Washington Streets hosted a Business 72 route in earlier years. This route was decommissioned in the 1980s.

US 72 has seen several route changes in Huntsville that included a temporary route down Sparkman Drive in the 1960s. Other original routes include Andrew Jackson Way to Holmes Avenue and down Holmes Avenue to reconnect to the original route.

Prior to 1931, US 72 passed through Big Cove between Huntsville and Paint Rock via Little Cove Rd/Old "US 431". That route was abandoned for the one used today over Chapman Mountain.

Other original routes include State Route 35 from Woodville to the west side of Scottsboro, State Route 279 east of Scottsboro, and State Route 277 from Stevenson to Bridgeport. State Route 277 carries the distinction of being the last two-lane section of US 72 in Alabama. Today, the entire route through Alabama has a minimum of four lanes.

Major intersections

Related routes

Muscle Shoals–Huntsville alternate route

U.S. Route 72 Alternate (US 72 Alternate) exists in Alabama on the south side of the Tennessee River between Muscle Shoals and Decatur. US 72 alt. crosses the Tennessee River at Decatur along with US 31 and follows the entire route of Interstate 565. However, signs on I-65 at the I-565 exit make no mention of US 72 Alt. and only mention SR 20 westbound from the I-65/I-565 junction. SR 20 was co-signed with US 72 Alt. from Muscle Shoals to Huntsville. SR 20 has since been truncated to the junction of I-65 just east of Decatur. Originally, US 72 Alt. turned off of SR 20 on to SR 53 (Jordan Lane) in Huntsville and followed it north  to rejoin with US 72. With the completion of I-565 in the early 1990s, US 72 Alt. was routed along with I-565 to the termination of I-565 at US 72.

US 72 Alternate between Decatur and Huntsville is part of Corridor V of the Appalachian Development Highway System.

See also
 
 Southern Rock Opera, a Drive-By Truckers album prominently featuring US 72
 List of United States Numbered Highways

Notes

References

The Drive By Truckers song “72 (This Highway’s Mean)” is written about highway 72.

Sources
 Rand McNally Road Atlases 1926 - 2006

External links

 Endpoints of U.S. Highway 72

 
072
072
072
072
072
Transportation in Chattanooga, Tennessee
Transportation in Huntsville, Alabama
Transportation in Memphis, Tennessee
Transportation in Shelby County, Tennessee
Transportation in Fayette County, Tennessee
Transportation in Marshall County, Mississippi
Transportation in Benton County, Mississippi
Transportation in Tippah County, Mississippi
Transportation in Alcorn County, Mississippi
Transportation in Tishomingo County, Mississippi
Transportation in Colbert County, Alabama
Transportation in Lauderdale County, Alabama
Transportation in Limestone County, Alabama
Transportation in Madison County, Alabama
Transportation in Jackson County, Alabama
Transportation in Marion County, Tennessee
Transportation in Hamilton County, Tennessee